Ernestine Schumann-Heink (15 June 186117 November 1936) was a Bohemian-born Austrian-American operatic dramatic contralto of German Bohemian descent. She was noted for the flexibility and wide range of her voice.

Early life
She was born Ernestine Amalie Pauline Rössler on 15 June 1861 to a German-speaking family at  Libeň, Bohemia, Austrian Empire, which is now part of the city of Prague, Czech Republic. She was baptized Catholic five days later. Her father, who called his daughter "Tini", was Hans Rössler. Before working as a shoe maker, he served as an Austrian cavalry officer. He had been stationed in northern Italy (then an Austrian protectorate), where he met and married Charlotte Goldman (Rössler), with whom he returned to Libeň. Her maternal grandmother, Leah Kohn, was of Hungarian Jewish descent and first prophesied Ernestine's successful career.

When Ernestine was three years old, the family moved to Verona. In 1866, at the outbreak of the Austro-Prussian War, the family moved to Prague, where she was schooled at the Ursuline Convent. At war's end, the Roesslers moved to Podgórze, now part of Kraków, where she attended the St. Andreas Convent. The family moved again to Graz when Ernestine was thirteen. Here she met Marietta von LeClair, a retired opera singer, who agreed to give her voice lessons.

In 1876, Ernestine gave her first professional performance (age 15) as alto soloist in Beethoven's Ninth Symphony in Graz. Her operatic debut was on 15 October 1878 at Dresden's Royal Opera House, where for four seasons she played the role of Azucena in Il trovatore，and served as principal contralto when she was 17.

First marriage
In 1882 she married Johann Georg Ernst Albert Heink (1854–1933), secretary of the Semperoper, the Saxon State Opera Dresden; this violated the terms of their contracts, and both had their employment abruptly terminated. Heink took a job at the local customs house and was soon transferred to Hamburg. Ernestine remained in Dresden to pursue her career, and eventually rejoined her husband when she secured a position at the Hamburg Opera. She went on to have four children with Heink: August, Charlotte, Henry and Hans.

Ernest Heink was again thrown out of work when Saxons were banned from government positions, and departed to Saxony to find work. Ernestine, pregnant, did not follow him; they were divorced in 1892 when Ernestine was thirty-one years old. She came to the United States to make a brief foray into the Broadway theater, playing in Julian Edwards' operetta Love's Lottery, in which her performance was noted for the fact that she often broke off to ask the audience whether her English was good enough. She left the production after 50 performances and soon returned to opera.

Her breakthrough into leading roles was provided when prima donna Marie Goetze argued with the director of the Hamburg opera. He asked Ernestine to sing the title role of Carmen, without rehearsal, which she did to great acclaim. Goetze, in a fit of pique, cancelled out of the role of Fidès in Le prophète, to be performed the following night, and was again replaced by Ernestine. Schumann-Heink replaced Goetze as Ortrud in Lohengrin the following evening, one more time without rehearsal, and was offered a ten-year contract.

In 1887, Ernestine sang Johannes Brahms' Alto Rhapsody under the direction of Hans von Bülow in a concert in Hamburg, with Brahms in attendance. She was then engaged by Bülow to sing in a cycle of Mozart performances later that year. However, Ernestine had to withdraw from these performances due to the coincidence with the birth of her fourth child, Hans, in November of 1887. This withdrawal angered Bülow, and their relationship did not continue.

Second marriage
After the divorce from her first husband, she married with Paul Schumann, an actor and director of the Thalia Theater in Hamburg in 1892. Ernestine acquired a stepson, Walter, and had three more children with Paul: Ferdinand Schumann, Marie Schumann and George Washington Schumann. This last boy was born in New York City, named by her good-humored mother with suggestion of the doctor who delivered the baby. One of their children, Ferdinand Schumann-Heink (1893–1958) was a prolific, though mostly unbilled, Hollywood character actor. It was a happy family.

Paul died in Germany, 28 November 1904. While fighting a legal battle in Germany over her late husband's estate, she filed her United States naturalization papers on 10 February 1905, and became a U.S. citizen on 3 March 1908.

International career

Schumann-Heink performed with Gustav Mahler at the Royal Opera House, Covent Garden, during the Hamburg company's London season in 1892, and became well known for her performances of the works of Richard Wagner, forging "a long and fruitful relationship with [the Annual] Bayreuth [Wagnerian music Festival]" that "lasted from 1896 to 1914".

Ernestine's first appearance at the Metropolitan Opera in New York City was in 1899, and she performed regularly there until 1932. She recorded the first of her many musical "gramophone" performances in 1900. Several of these early sound recordings originally released on 78 RPM discs have been reissued on CD format. Although there are some imperfections in her singing, her musical technique still leave a deep impression on the audience.

Third marriage
On 11 February 1905, Ernestine became an American citizen. On 27 May 1905, in Chicago, Illinois, she married her manager William Rapp, Jr when she was forty-three. She and her new husband lived on Grandview Avenue, North Caldwell, New Jersey in her "Villa Fides" from April 1906 to December 1911; she then moved to 500 acres (2 km²) of farm land located just outside San Diego, California (in an area then known as Helix Hill – now known as Mt. Helix – in Grossmont), purchased by her in January 1910, where she would live for most of her life. Her residence there is still standing.

In 1909, she created the role of Klytaemnestra in the debut of Richard Strauss's Elektra, of which she said she had no high opinion, calling it "a fearful din". Strauss was not entirely captivated by Schumann-Heink either; according to one story, during rehearsals he admonished the orchestra, "Louder! I can still hear Madame Schumann-Heink!"

She separated from her husband on 10 December, 1911. She filed for divorce in 1913. They divorced in 1914 and the appeals court upheld the lower court decision in 1915.

In 1915, she appeared as herself in the early documentary film Mabel and Fatty Viewing the World's Fair at San Francisco directed by Fatty Arbuckle, who also appears as himself in the film.

Charitable work and community support

While living at North Caldwell, New Jersey Schumann-Heink became interested in efforts to honor President Grover Cleveland. The future president was born in 1837 in nearby Caldwell, New Jersey, where his father, Rev. Richard Cleveland was minister of the First Presbyterian Church. On 10 September, 1912, Schumann-Heink performed a benefit concert at the church to raise money to purchase the adjacent Presbyterian Manse, Cleveland's birthplace. In 1913, the Grover Cleveland Birthplace Memorial Association (GCBMA) purchased the Manse and opened it to the public as a museum. Mme. Schumann-Heink became the first lifetime member of the GCBMA. 

During World War I, Schumann-Heink supported the United States and its armed forces. She entertained the troops and raised money for Liberty Bonds, as well as "the Red Cross, knights of Columbus, Young Men's Christian Association, and Jewish War Relief, and to entertaining soldiers Throughout the United States" in order to help wounded veterans. She toured the United States raising money for the war effort, although she had relatives fighting on both sides of the war – including her sons August Heink, a merchant sailor who had been impressed into the German submarine service, Walter Schumann, Henry Heink and George Washington Schumann, all in the United States Navy.

Later years
In 1926, she first sang Stille Nacht (Silent Night) (in both German and English) over the radio for Christmas. This became a Christmas tradition with US radio listeners through Christmas of 1935. In 1927, she performed in an early Vitaphone sound short film, possibly the only surviving footage of her singing other than a brief performance she gave during the filming of a voice lesson she was giving to a group of aspiring young American mezzo-sopranos.  She lost most of her assets in the Wall Street Crash of 1929 and was forced to sing again at age 69.
In 1926, then 65, she had begun a weekly radio program, in addition to announcing her plans to "teach forty American girls"; Schumann "spent considerable time advising women to forgo politics, smoking and unchaperoned dancing, and to devote themselves to bringing up children". In 1929, she taught tenor Arnold Blackner. Her last performance at the Met was in 1932 performing Erda in Der Ring des Nibelungen, aged 71. In the movies of the 1930s, many a buxom opera singer/instructor/matron was modeled on her; see for instance 1937's Stage Door.

In January 1927 the American Tobacco Company launched a print advertisement campaign for their Lucky Strikes brand featuring Schumann-Heink's photo and endorsement, the first campaign of its kind in the United States that featured a woman. The advertisement included the statement signed by Schumann-Heink "I recommend Lucky Strikes because they are kind to my throat". The copy also included ATC's statement "When smoking, she prefers Lucky Strikes because they give the greatest enjoyment and throat protection." Later that year, Schumann-Heink refuted the endorsement as fraudulent, and by the end of 1927 ATC reran the same campaign but with Nina Morgana's endorsement instead.

Death and legacy 

Schumann-Heink died of leukemia on 17 November 1936 in Hollywood, California at the age of 75. Her funeral was conducted by the American Legion at the Hollywood Post Auditorium, and she was  interred at Greenwood Memorial Park in San Diego. Her archive was donated to the Smithsonian Institution.  On Memorial Day, 30 May 1938, a bronze tablet honouring Schumann-Heink was unveiled by her granddaughter, Barbara Heink, at the Organ Pavilion in Balboa Park, San Diego. The tablet featured a star that reads:

Operatic roles, with notable performances

References

Further reading
Kennedy, Michael (2006), The Oxford Dictionary of Music, 985 pages, 
Warrack, John and West, Ewan (1992), The Oxford Dictionary of Opera, 782 pages,

External links

 
Schumann-Heink on cantabile-subito.de Biography with photos and audio samples
Ernestine Schumann-Heink and actress Bette Davis 1930s
Schumann-Heink in Popular Science Dec. 1956 (p.248) – Savings Bond advertisement
Ernestine Schumann-Heink music collection digitized by Claremont College
Recordings
 Ernestine Schumann-Heink recordings at the Discography of American Historical Recordings.
Ernestine Schumann-Heink: streaming audio at the Library of Congress.

1861 births
1936 deaths
20th-century Austrian women opera singers
19th-century Austrian  women opera singers
Jewish opera singers
Operatic contraltos
German Bohemian people
Austrian people of Hungarian-Jewish descent
Austro-Hungarian emigrants to the United States
American people of German Bohemian descent
Musicians from Prague
Deaths from leukemia
Deaths from cancer in California
Burials at Greenwood Memorial Park (San Diego)
Victor Records artists